Real Man 300 is a South Korean reality program featuring male and female celebrities as they experience life in the military. It is a spin-off of reality program Real Man which had ended in 2016. It aired on MBC every Friday at 21:50 (KST) from September 21, 2018 to January 25, 2019.

List of editions and cast members

Korea Army Academy

Special Warfare School

"White Skull" Unit

Ratings
In the table below,  represent the lowest ratings and  represent the highest ratings.

2018

2019

Awards and nominations

References

External links
 

2018 South Korean television series debuts
2019 South Korean television series endings
MBC TV original programming
Korean-language television shows
South Korean military television series
South Korean reality television series
Television series about the Republic of Korea Armed Forces